Undressed is an American anthology series that aired on MTV in the early 2000s.

Undressed may also refer to:
Undressed (film), a lost 1928 silent film drama
Undressed (Pansy Division album), 1993
Undressed (Kim Cesarion album), 2014
"Undressed" (song), the title track
Undressed, a reality dating show series that aired on MTV in 2017
"Undressed", a song by White Town from Women in Technology